The Cardboard Village is a 2011 Italian drama film directed by Ermanno Olmi.

Plot 
A now uninhabitable church is decommissioned in the presence of the old pastor. The environment is stripped of all sacred furnishings, and not even the large crucifix will be saved. From this situation begins a new life for the building, which, now stripped of all liturgical and "institutional" aspects, is transformed into the place of the living concretization of the old priest's faith. A place of desolation is thus transformed into a space of brotherhood and welcome for a group of non-EU Africans without residence permits, the embodiment of the excluded and marginalized in our society.

Cast
 Michael Lonsdale as Il Vecchio Prete
 Rutger Hauer as Il Sacrestano
 Massimo De Francovich as Il Medico
 Alessandro Haber as Il Graduato
 Ibrahima Faye El Hadji as Il Soccorritore
 Irma Pino Viney as Magdha
 Fatima Alì as Fatima
 Samuels Leon Delroy as Il Bardo
 Fernando Chronda as Il Cherubino
 Souleymane Sow as L'Avverso
 Linda Keny as Madre

See also
 Films about immigration to Italy

References

External links
 

2011 films
2011 drama films
2010s Italian-language films
Italian drama films
Films directed by Ermanno Olmi
Films about immigration
2010s Italian films